Clay Matvick (born August 12, 1973 in Saint Cloud, Minnesota) is an American sportscaster, who works primarily as a play-by-play announcer for ABC and the ESPN networks.

Background 
Matvick graduated from Princeton High School in 1991. He received a degree in mass communications from St. Cloud State University in 1996.

Career 
Matvick began his broadcasting career in 1990 in his hometown of Princeton, Minnesota, at WQPM (now BOB 106). He worked as a weekend sports anchor from 1990 to 1999 at various stations in Minnesota, KDLT in South Dakota and KMTV in Nebraska.

In 1999, he was hired as a presenter for CNN Sports Illustrated in Atlanta, working there until 2001.

After leaving CNNSI, he worked for Fox Sports Net North in Minneapolis from 2001 to 2005.

In 2004, he began play-by-play for the Minnesota Boys High School Hockey Tournament.

In 2006, Matvick joined ESPN, handling play-by-play of college football, college basketball, hockey, baseball, softball, and the Little League World Series.

Recognition

Awards and nominations 
Matvick has won three Upper Midwest regional Emmy awards for his work covering the Minnesota Boys High School Hockey Tournament for KSTC-TV, in 2006, 2007, and 2008.

Personal life
He and his wife Lindsay live in Minnesota.

References

External links 
 

1973 births
Living people
American television sports announcers
College basketball announcers in the United States
College football announcers
Major League Baseball broadcasters
Minnesota Twins announcers
Minnesota Wild announcers
National Hockey League broadcasters
College hockey announcers in the United States
Women's college basketball announcers in the United States
Softball announcers